Longstreet is a village in DeSoto Parish, Louisiana, United States. The population was 157 at the 2010 census. It is part of the Shreveport–Bossier City Metropolitan Statistical Area.

Longstreet is named for Confederate General James Longstreet.

Geography
Longstreet is located in western DeSoto Parish at  (32.096934, -93.950306). Louisiana Highway 5 passes through the town, leading north  to Keachi and south  to Logansport.

Demographics

As of the census of 2000, there were 163 people, 70 households, and 45 families residing in the village. The racial makeup of the village was 85.28% White, 11.04% African American and 3.68% Native American. Hispanic or Latino of any race were 0.61% of the population.

There were 70 households, out of which 24.3% had children under the age of 18 living with them, 54.3% were married couples living together, 7.1% had a female householder with no husband present, and 35.7% were non-families. 32.9% of all households were made up of individuals, and 21.4% had someone living alone who was 65 years of age or older. The average household size was 2.33 and the average family size was 3.00.

In the village, the population was spread out, with 22.7% under the age of 18, 4.3% from 18 to 24, 26.4% from 25 to 44, 27.0% from 45 to 64, and 19.6% who were 65 years of age or older. The median age was 42 years. For every 100 females, there were 91.8 males. For every 100 females age 18 and over, there were 90.9 males.

The median income for a household in the village was $28,333, and the median income for a family was $51,500. Males had a median income of $31,250 versus $12,344 for females. The per capita income for the village was $15,359. About 12.5% of families and 9.6% of the population were below the poverty line, including none of those under the age of eighteen and 24.2% of those 65 or over.

References

Villages in DeSoto Parish, Louisiana
Villages in Louisiana
Villages in Shreveport – Bossier City metropolitan area